The Cycle may refer to:

 The Cycle (1975 film), an Iranian film
 The Cycle (2009 film), a Canadian/Czech horror film
 The Cycle (talk show), a 2012–2015 American political talk show and television program that aired on MSNBC
 The Cycle (video game), by Yager Development

See also
 Cycle (disambiguation)